Seo Hyeon-su (born 2 June 1978) is a South Korean swimmer. She competed in the women's 800 metre freestyle event at the 1996 Summer Olympics.

References

External links
 

1978 births
Living people
Olympic swimmers of South Korea
Swimmers at the 1996 Summer Olympics
Place of birth missing (living people)
South Korean female freestyle swimmers